Lomilik is a seamount in the Western Pacific Ocean, within the exclusive economic zone of the Marshall Islands. It lies to the west of Anewetak atoll and is named after the best fishing site of Anewetak atoll.

The summit terrace is covered by rocks with ooze in between. A notch in the southern flank of Lomilik was probably created by a landslide. It is part of the Magellan Seamounts and consists of a Cretaceous volcano with a thin layer of carbonate rocks and ferromanganese. Lami seamount lies northwest of Lomilik.

The rocks found on Lomilik consist of basalt and limestone. Fluorapatite, hyaloclastite, mudstone, phosphorite and siltstone have been identified in rocks from the seamount. The deposits on Lomilik could potentially be mined.

References

Sources 

 
 
 

Seamounts of the Pacific Ocean
Landforms of the Marshall Islands
Ralik Chain